The Legislative Assembly of Perm Krai is the regional parliament of Perm Krai, a federal subject of Russia. A total of 60 deputies are elected for five-year terms.

Elections

2021

List of chairmen 
 Nikolay Devyatkin — 2006 to 2011
 Valery Sukhikh — 2011 to present

References 

Politics of Perm Krai
Perm